Laura Cutina (born 13 September 1968) is a retired Romanian artistic gymnast. She is an Olympic gold medalist and a two-time world silver medalist with the team. After retiring from competitions she worked as gymnastics coach. In 1990 she moved to Italy and then to the United States.

References

External links
 
 
 

1968 births
Living people
Romanian female artistic gymnasts
Olympic gymnasts of Romania
Olympic gold medalists for Romania
Olympic medalists in gymnastics
Gymnasts at the 1984 Summer Olympics
Medalists at the 1984 Summer Olympics
Medalists at the World Artistic Gymnastics Championships
Gymnasts from Bucharest
20th-century Romanian women